Gary Michael Restaino (born 1968) is an American lawyer who has served as the United States Attorney for the District of Arizona since 2021 and as the acting director of the Bureau of Alcohol, Tobacco, Firearms, and Explosives from April 25 to July 13, 2022.

Education 
Restaino earned a Bachelor of Arts degree from Haverford College in 1990 and a Juris Doctor from the University of Virginia School of Law in 1996.

Career 
From 1991 to 1993, Restaino served in Paraguay with the Peace Corps. From 1996 to 1999, he provided legal services to seasonal farm workers as a lawyer with Community Legal Services. From 1999 to 2003, he served as a civil rights lawyer in the Arizona Attorney General's Office. He then served as a trial attorney in the Public Integrity Section of the United States Department of Justice. Restaino joined the United States Attorney's Office for the District of Arizona in 2003. He was nominated to serve as United States attorney in October 2021. On November 19, 2021, his nomination was confirmed in the United States Senate by voice vote. He was sworn into office on November 23, 2021, by Chief Judge G. Murray Snow.

References

External links
 Biography at U.S. Department of Justice

1968 births
Living people
20th-century American lawyers
21st-century American lawyers
Arizona lawyers
Haverford College alumni
Peace Corps volunteers
People from Edison, New Jersey
United States Attorneys for the District of Arizona
United States Department of Justice lawyers
United States Department of Justice officials
University of Virginia School of Law alumni